Steele Butte is a summit in Garfield County, Utah, United States with an elevation of .

Steele Butte was named for Pete Steele, a pioneer settler.

References

Mountains of Garfield County, Utah
Buttes of Utah